was a protected cruiser of the Imperial Japanese Navy, acquired as a prize of war during the Russo-Japanese War from the Imperial Russian Navy, where it was originally known as .

Background
Pallada was built by the Admiralty Shipyard in St Petersburg, Russia for the Imperial Russian Navy.

With the start of the Russo-Japanese War in 1904, Pallada was trapped at Port Arthur, and subsequently sunk by Japanese artillery during the Siege of Port Arthur on 8 December 1904.

Service record

After the capture of Port Arthur by the Japanese, the wreck of Pallada was raised, repaired, and commissioned into the Imperial Japanese Navy as the second-class cruiser Tsugaru on 22 August 1908. Her new name came from the Tsugaru Strait between Honshū and Hokkaidō.

After commissioning into the Japanese navy, Tsugaru was used almost exclusively for training duties, especially for mechanical systems training, and rarely left Japanese home waters.

On 1 April 1920, Tsugaru was re-classified as a minelayer with 300 mines. She was removed from the active list on 1 April 1922, and scuttled with explosive charges in the Pacific Ocean off Yokosuka, Japan, on 27 May 1924.

The cruiser Tsugaru should not be confused with the Pacific War era minelayer of the same name.

Gallery

References

 Evans, David. Kaigun: Strategy, Tactics, and Technology in the Imperial Japanese Navy, 1887-1941. US Naval Institute Press (1979). 
 Howarth, Stephen.  The Fighting Ships of the Rising Sun: The Drama of the Imperial Japanese Navy, 1895-1945. Atheneum; (1983) 
 Jane, Fred T. The Imperial Japanese Navy. Thacker, Spink & Co (1904) ASIN: B00085LCZ4
 Jentsura, Hansgeorg. Warships of the Imperial Japanese Navy, 1869-1945. Naval Institute Press (1976). 
 Schencking, J. Charles. Making Waves: Politics, Propaganda, And The Emergence Of The Imperial Japanese Navy, 1868-1922. Stanford University Press (2005). 

Cruisers of the Imperial Japanese Navy
Ships built at Admiralty Shipyard
1899 ships
Russo-Japanese War cruisers of Japan
World War I cruisers of Japan
Maritime incidents in 1924
Scuttled vessels
Shipwrecks in the Pacific Ocean

ja:津軽 (防護巡洋艦)